Lason Jackson (born July 23, 1979), better known as La the Darkman, is a Wu-Tang Clan affiliated rapper and MC.

Biography
Jackson was born in New York City, New York and grew up Crown Heights, Brooklyn with his brother William Jackson. He negotiated his first deal while finishing high school and was a protégé of the Wu-Tang Clan having grown particularly close with various members. Jackson later secured a distribution deal through Navarre Distribution, with whom he released his debut album Heist of the Century in 1998. He later toured with several singers and groups such as 50 Cent and the Wu-Tang Clan, as well as launching his own management company and children's clothing store. Jackson later relocated to Atlanta, Georgia, where he worked with Aphilliates Music Group and Embassy Entertainment, later negotiating a joint-venture deal with both companies for Universal Records. He also worked in a business capacity for DJ Drama, setting up booking arrangements and endorsement deals. Jackson also executive produced the album Gangsta Grillz vol.1 and vol.2 which both albums hit #2 and #4 on the Billboard charts.

He is the older brother of rapper Willie the Kid.

Reception
Though Lason Jackson's Heist of the Century album was largely panned by WARR.org, it wrote, “there is a lot of the unique energy that characterizes most Wu-Tang releases,” and “they make a strong argument for picking this up especially if you’re a Wu completist". The independently released Heist of the Century later peaked at 37 on Billboard's "R&B/Hip-Hop Albums" in May 1998.

Rapper/actor Drake mentioned Jackson during a MTV interview calling him one of the "Hottest MCs in the Game". Vibe praised Jackson's participation in the Uncontrolled Substance album, calling his overtures "seductive".

Discography

Albums
 Heist of the Century (1998)
 La Paraphernalia EP (2014) 
 La Familia EP (2015)
 La Luminati EP (2016)
 Play by La Rules EP (2017)
 The Lavish vs The Savage EP (2017)

Appearances
Soul Assassins I - DJ Muggs (1997)
Uncontrolled Substance - Inspectah Deck (1999)
Beneath The Surface - GZA (1999)
Ghost Dog: The Way of the Samurai (soundtrack) (1999)Bi-Polar - Vanilla Ice (2001)The Greatest Story Never Told - Shyheim (2004)I Got Your Money - Ol Dirty Bastard (2004)4:21... The Day After - Method Man (2006)Gangsta Grillz Vol. 1 & 2 (Albums) - DJ Drama (2007) & (2009)Absolute Greatness LP & Never A Dull Moment LP - Willie the Kid

Mixtapes
 Return of the Darkman (with J-Love) (2006)
 Dead Presidents (with Willie the Kid) (2006)
 The Notorious LAD (with DJ Drama) (2008)
 Living Notoriously (with DJ Drama) (2009)
 Return of the Darkman, Part 2 (with J-Love) (2010)
 Embassy Invasion (with DJ Green Lantern) (2011))
 Living Notoriously Part 2 (as "L.A.D. a.k.a. La...") (2011)
 "Midwest Kush: Pyrex Edition" L.A.D (2011)                                                       
 "Midwest Kush: Pyrex Edition pt.2" (2012)
 "Diary of a Playboy" (2012)
 "Diary of a Playboy 2" (2013)
 "Paid in Full" (2014)
 "Paid in Full 2" (2016)
 "Paid in Full 3" (2018)
 "Wu La Familia" (with DoloMite) (2020)

Singles
 I Want It All'' (1999)

References

External links
La The Darkman profile at Wu-Tang Corp

Living people
African-American male rappers
Wu-Tang Clan affiliates
Five percenters
Rappers from Brooklyn
1981 births
Midwest hip hop musicians
Rappers from Michigan
Musicians from Grand Rapids, Michigan
21st-century American rappers